Canarina abyssinica is a dull grey-green plant with fleshy rootstock and triangular, ovate leaves. Its pendulous, solitary flowers 5–6 cm long are orange-red with a five lobed calyx and a large corolla that is tubular or bell-shaped.

Distribution
An uncommon species found in wet forests at altitudes of 1620–2130 m, especially in western and central Kenya; Arusha  in Tanzania; Mbale in Uganda; also in Ethiopia and South Sudan.

References

Collins Guide to the Wildflowers of East Africa by Sir Michael Blundell, 1987. 

Campanuloideae
Flora of Northeast Tropical Africa
Flora of East Tropical Africa
Plants described in 1902